The Act in Question is a 1994 Argentine film directed and written by Alejandro Agresti. The film starred Carlos Roffé and Sergio Poves Campos. The film was also released in the Netherlands and Portugal. It was screened in the Un Certain Regard section at the 1993 Cannes Film Festival.

This movie was partly recorded in a castle in Oostakker near Ghent in Belgium (1992). The family "De Bruyn" who owned the castle, played as observers in the movie.

Cast
Carlos Roffé as Miguel Quiroga
Sergio Poves Campos as Amilcar Liguori
Lorenzo Quinteros as Rogelio
Mirta Busnelli as Azusena
Nathalie Alonso Casale as  Sylvie
Daniel Burzaco/Nestor Sanz as Natalio Ruiz
Guido Lauwaert as Mute friend

References

External links
 

1994 films
1990s Spanish-language films
1994 drama films
Argentine black-and-white films
Films directed by Alejandro Agresti
Argentine drama films
1990s Argentine films